Ryan Samuel Brunt (born 26 May 1993) is an English former professional footballer who played as a forward.

Career

Stoke City
Born in Birmingham, West Midlands, Brunt started his football career with Bristol City's youth team before joining Stoke City's academy in 2010. Brunt began well at Stoke scoring a hat trick against Walsall reserves in September 2010. However Brunt missed most of the 2010–11 season after suffering a cruciate knee ligament injury. After recovering from his injury Brunt joined Northern Premier League Premier Division club Nantwich Town on loan and his first appearance for them was in the FA Cup first round against Milton Keynes Dons which Nantwich lost 6–0. Whilst still out on loan at Nantwich, Brunt played and scored in a reserve match for Stoke against Rotherham United. He impressed watching Luton Town manager Gary Brabin who signed Brunt on a month's work experience on 16 November 2011. He made six appearances for Luton before returning to Stoke after an extension could not be agreed.

On 27 January 2012, Brunt joined League One club Tranmere Rovers on a one-month loan. He made his Football League debut as an 85th-minute substitute in a 1–1 draw at home to Huddersfield Town. He scored his first professional goal with a low shot from a Martin Devaney cross in a 1–1 home draw with Charlton Athletic on 18 February 2012. Brunt extended his loan with Rovers for a second month.

On 17 July 2012, Brunt joined League One club Leyton Orient on a six-month loan. He scored his first goal for Orient in a 1–0 win over Brentford at home on 13 September 2012, despite appearing to be in an offside position. He ended his loan spell with Orient having scored three goals in 22 appearances.

Bristol Rovers
Brunt joined League Two club Bristol Rovers on 23 January 2013 on a two-and-a-half-year contract. He made his debut for Rovers in a 3–1 away win over Rotherham United on 26 January 2013, being fouled for a penalty kick that was scored before being substituted after 81 minutes. He scored his first goal for Rovers with a shot from a narrow angle during injury time of his home debut against Barnet in a 2–1 victory.

Brunt joined League Two club York City on 30 September 2014 on a one-month emergency loan, with his debut coming in a 0–0 home draw with Portsmouth on 4 October. He made six appearances for York before the loan expired on 1 November 2014. Brunt returned to Bristol Rovers and started the matches against Tranmere Rovers, Alfreton Town and Kidderminster Harriers before the arrival of Nathan Blissett and Bradley Goldberg on loan pushed Brunt back down the pecking order at Rovers. He was loaned out again on 27 November 2014, this time to League Two side Stevenage until January 2015.

Plymouth Argyle
On 20 January 2015, Brunt signed for League Two club Plymouth Argyle on an 18-month contract. Brunt suffered a serious knee injury in the 1–0 away defeat to Barnet on 1 March. This sidelined him for over nine months, missing the entire first half of the 2016–17 season. He was released by the club at the end of 2016–17, and turned down the opportunity to train with the club in pre-season.

Exeter City
Brunt signed for League Two club Exeter City on 1 August 2017 on an undisclosed-length contract following a successful trial. He was released by Exeter at the end of the 2017–18 season.

Bath City
Brunt signed for National League South club Bath City on 30 June 2018 on a one-year contract. The 2018–19 season ended in disappointment as Bath lost in the Play off eliminator to Wealdstone with Brunt being sent off for a dangerous tackle in the 73rd minute. The following season ended in similar fashion when Bath fell at the same hurdle. After the season had concluded early due to the coronavirus pandemic, Bath again lost the playoff eliminator with Brunt scoring as Dorking Wanderers ran out 2-1 victors. Brunt departed Bath on 29 July 2020.

Chippenham Town
Brunt joined fellow National League South side Chippenham Town on 9 October 2020, signing a short-term deal.

Career statistics

Personal life
In 2013 Brunt started fitness business RecoverFit, supplying recovery and fitness equipment to clients including Anthony Joshua and Swansea City. In 2017, RecoverFit signed a deal with the NFL to supply their recovery systems for their UK fixtures.

References

External links

Ryan Brunt profile at the Bath City F.C. website

1993 births
Living people
Footballers from Birmingham, West Midlands
English footballers
Association football forwards
Bristol City F.C. players
Stoke City F.C. players
Nantwich Town F.C. players
Luton Town F.C. players
Tranmere Rovers F.C. players
Leyton Orient F.C. players
Bristol Rovers F.C. players
York City F.C. players
Stevenage F.C. players
Plymouth Argyle F.C. players
Exeter City F.C. players
Bath City F.C. players
Chippenham Town F.C. players
National League (English football) players
English Football League players